Brad King (born 4 February 1966) is a Canadian former alpine skier who competed in the 1992 Winter Olympics.

References

1966 births
Living people
Canadian male alpine skiers
Olympic alpine skiers of Canada
Alpine skiers at the 1992 Winter Olympics